Choti or Chhoti is a Pakistani television drama soap serial aired on Geo Entertainment. The serial is written by Rukhsana Nigar and produced by Asif Raza Mir and Babar Javed under their production banner, A&B Productions. It stars actor Sara Kashif, Sanam Chaudhry, Asma Abbas, Yasir Mazhar, Ali Shaikh and Yasra Rizvi in lead roles initially joined by Saniya Shamshad, Azekah Daniel, Asad Siddiqui and Farwa Kazmi later. The story is about difficulties coming into Choti's life. The show also tells about social problems and devils in our society and how middle-class and poor people face them.

Cast 
 Saniya Shamshad as Najia\Jia aka Choti- Rasheeda and Fareed youngest daughter, who works as maid and give company to Naila's daughter but later adopted by Hassan.
 Shaista Jabeen as Rasheeda- Choti's mother. A poverty-stricken and stone hearted mother working as maid and want her daughters to do the same to earn bread for the family.  
 Sanam Chaudhry as Saira- Elder daughter of Rasheeda. A caring sister who doesn't want "Chhoti" to work as maid.  
 Asma Abbas as Begum- A cruel wealthy woman who detest the poor people.
 Aliee Shaikh as Noman- Younger son of Begum and a spoiled brat. He wants his share of the family business to fulfil his girlfriend's wants. He mentally harasses, bullies, and abuses "Chhoti" and tries to harass Saira too.
 Yasir Mazhar as Usman- Elder son of Begum. Sane and responsible son, who doesn't want to give business share to Noman due to his non-seriousness towards business.
 Salma Hassan as Naila- Usman's wife. She is kind hearted and hires "Chhoti" to spend time with her daughter. 
 Taifoor Khan as Dr.Hassan- Noman's friend. He has complicated relationship with wife, Amna due to her carefree attitude towards their daughter, Honey and Amna's past relationship with Dawood.
 Yasra Rizvi as Dr.Amna- Hassan's wife. She is more concerned towards her career which leads her daughter to have mental problems.
 Rahma Ali as Rohina aka Rohi- love interest of Noman. She's greedy, stubborn and wants to marry Noman on certain conditions. She was married to Aadil before and hides this from Noman and his family but despite all this still marries Noman secretly.
 Sukaina Khan as Ruqaiyya- Middle daughter of Rasheeda.
 Seemi Pasha as Salma- Rohina's mother. She wants Rohina to tell to Noman's family about Aadil.
 Minhaj Askari as Khalid- Saira's fiance but doubts her as he have seen her with Noman few times.
 Farah Nadir as Abida- Khalid's mother and Rasheeda's sister.  
 Amir Mustafa Qureshi as Dr.Dawood/Aadil- Amna's past love interest who comes back in her life and Rohina's first husband.
 Uzair Abbasi as Fareed- Saira, Ruqaiyya, Billu and Choti's father. 
 Rehana Kaleem as Nasreen- Maid at Begum's home.
 Shehzad Mukhtar as Riaz- Rohina's father.
 Asad Siddiqui as Umair - Arifa's brother and Naila's nephew 
 Azekah Daniel as Pinky- Naila and Usman daughter
 Afraz Rasool as Sheeraz- Naila and Usman son
 Farwa Kazmi as Arifa- Sheeraz's fiance and Naila's niece
 Farah Nadeem as Aapa

Child stars
 Sara Kashif as Choti- Rasheeda and Fareed youngest daughter
 Zainab Imdad as Honey- Amna and Hassan daughter
 Ashan Zeeshan as Sheeraz aka Shehzi- Naila and Usman son
 Fatima Kamran as Pinky- Naila and Usman daughter
 Saifullah Sohail as Bilal aka Billu- Rasheeda and Fareed only son, who's sick and can't work.
 Hira Ahmed as Arifa- Naila's niece
 Murtaza Sohail as Umair- Naila's nephew

Release
The serial started airing on 2 May 2014 and few episodes aired already but due to Geo TV controversy show was pulled off along with other shows on the channel. It was released on 17 October again airing from Friday to Sunday at 7:30 PM.

References

External links 
 Choti-Official Site

2014 Pakistani television series debuts
2015 Pakistani television series endings
Geo TV original programming
Pakistani drama television series
Pakistani television soap operas
Urdu-language television shows